(André Jacques) Victor Orsel (25 May 1795, Oullins, Rhône - 30 November 1850, Paris) was a French painter. A student of Pierre Révoil in Lyon then of Pierre-Narcisse Guérin in Paris, he then spent 7 years at the villa Médicis in Rome (1822–29), where he worked in the orbit of Overbeck and the Nazarene movement, and copied the Italian 'primitives', leaving his own art with an archaising tendency. He died unmarried.

External links 
 Genealogy

1795 births
1850 deaths
People from Oullins
19th-century French painters
French male painters
19th-century French male artists
18th-century French male artists